"Barbados" is the debut single by English band Typically Tropical, released in May 1975.

"Barbados" entered the UK Singles Chart at number 37 in late June 1975, and five weeks later it hit number one for a week. In total, "Barbados" spent eleven weeks on the chart. The track also reached number one on the Irish Singles Chart, the South African Singles Chart, and number 20 on the Australian Singles Chart (Kent Music Report). The track was later released on an album in 1975 by Gull Records, named Barbados Sky.

Follow-up singles "Rocket Now" and "The Ghost Song" failed to chart, leaving Typically Tropical as a one-hit wonder.

In 1999, a reworked version of the song, renamed "We're Going to Ibiza", also reached the UK number one spot for the Vengaboys.

Charts

See also
List of number-one singles from the 1970s (UK)
List of number-one singles of 1975 (Ireland)

References

Songs about North America
Barbados in fiction
1975 debut singles
British reggae songs
UK Singles Chart number-one singles
Irish Singles Chart number-one singles
Number-one singles in South Africa
1975 songs